Coptotriche agrimoniella is a moth of the family Tischeriidae. It is found in North America, including Arkansas, Kentucky and Ohio.

The larvae feed on Agrimonia parviflora and Agrimonia rostellata. They mine the leaves of their host plant.

References

Moths described in 1972
Tischeriidae